Justice Waits is a 2005 biography by Joel Davis about the 1980 murders of two UC Davis freshmen, John Riggins and Sabrina Gonsalves. Dubbed "The Sweetheart Murders", the case remained cold until August 27, 2002, when incriminating DNA evidence obtained from a blanket in the kidnappers' van proved that convicted child molester Richard Hirschfield was involved in the murders. 

Davis, who had attended school with Riggins, persisted to persuade the police to re-examine the case.

References 

2005 non-fiction books
American non-fiction books